The FIS Nordic World Ski Championships 1937 took place on February 12–18, 1937, in Chamonix, France. The French city hosted the 1924 Winter Olympics which is considered by the FIS as the first FIS Nordic World Ski Championships.

Men's cross country

18 km 
February 14, 1937

50 km 
February 16, 1937

4 × 10 km relay
February 18, 1937

Men's Nordic combined

Individual 
February 12, 1937

Men's ski jumping

Individual large hill 
February 12, 1937

Medal table

References
FIS 1937 Cross country results
FIS 1937 Nordic combined results
FIS 1937 Ski jumping results
Hansen, Hermann & Sveen, Knut. (1996) VM på ski '97. Alt om ski-VM 1925-1997 Trondheim: Adresseavisens Forlag. p. 57. . 

FIS Nordic World Ski Championships
1937 in Nordic combined
1937 in French sport
February 1937 sports events
Nordic skiing competitions in France
Nordic World Ski